Magdalena Sibylle of Saxe-Weissenfels (2 September 1648 – 7 January 1681) was a German noblewoman.

She was a daughter of August, duke of Saxe-Weissenfels, and his wife Anna Maria of Mecklenburg-Schwerin. Her paternal grandparents were John George I, Elector of Saxony, and Magdalene Sibylle of Prussia.

On 14 November 1669, she married Duke Friedrich I of Saxe-Gotha-Altenburg.  They had the following children:

 Anna Sophie (b. Gotha, 22 December 1670 – d. Rudolstadt, 28 December 1728), married on 15 October 1691 to Louis Frederick I, Prince of Schwarzburg-Rudolstadt.
 Magdalene Sibylle (b. Gotha, 30 September 1671 – d. Altenburg, 2 March 1673).
 Dorothea Marie (b. Gotha, 22 January 1674 – d. Meiningen, 18 April 1713), married on 19 September 1704 to Ernst Ludwig I, Duke of Saxe-Meiningen.
 Fredericka (b. Gotha, 24 March 1675 – d. Karlsbad, 28 May 1709), married on 25 May 1702 to Johann August, Prince of Anhalt-Zerbst.
 Frederick II, Duke of Saxe-Gotha-Altenburg (b. Gotha, 28 July 1676 – d. Altenburg, 23 March 1732).
 Johann Wilhelm (b. Gotha, 4 October 1677 – killed in battle, Toulon, 15 August 1707), General Imperial.
 Elisabeth (b. Gotha, 7 February 1679 – d. of smallpox, Gotha, 22 June 1680).
 Johanna (b. Gotha, 1 October 1680 – d. Strelitz, 9 July 1704), married on 20 June 1702 to Adolf Frederick II, Duke of Mecklenburg-Strelitz.

|-

1648 births
1681 deaths
House of Saxe-Weissenfels
House of Saxe-Gotha-Altenburg
Duchesses of Saxe-Gotha-Altenburg
Albertine branch
Daughters of monarchs